The coat of arms of Halifax, Nova Scotia is the full armorial achievement as used by the municipal government as an official symbol.

References 

Halifax Regional Municipality
Government in Halifax, Nova Scotia
Halifax
Halifax
Halifax
Halifax
Halifax
Halifax
Halifax
Halifax